Antonio Desez Cochran (born June 21, 1976) is a former American football player who played seven seasons in the National Football League.

Cochran attended Macon County High School in Montezuma, Georgia. He also attended Middle Georgia College before transferring to Georgia.

Cochran signed with Florida out of HS, but attended Okaloosa-Walton on a basketball scholarship. After contributing as a part-time starter on O-W's national championship BASKETBALL team, he transferred to Middle Georgia College (MGC) to play football.

External links
NFL player profile
Seattle Seahawks bio from 2004

1976 births
Living people
University of Georgia alumni
African-American players of American football
American football defensive ends
Seattle Seahawks players
Arizona Cardinals players
Georgia Bulldogs football players
People from Montezuma, Georgia
Players of American football from Georgia (U.S. state)
Northwest Florida State Raiders men's basketball players
Middle Georgia Warriors football players
American men's basketball players
21st-century African-American sportspeople
20th-century African-American sportspeople